Konan Ignace Jocelyn N'Dri (born 27 October 2000) is an Ivorian professional footballer who plays as a midfielder for Eupen.

Club career
On 31 January 2019, he signed a contract with the Belgian club Eupen with a term until 30 June 2019.

He made his Belgian First Division A debut for Eupen on 3 March 2019 in a game against Antwerp, as a 76th-minute substitute for Eric Ocansey. He scored his first goal in a 3-1 win over Beerschot V.A

References

External links
 

2000 births
Living people
Ivorian footballers
Association football midfielders
K.A.S. Eupen players
Belgian Pro League players
Ivorian expatriate footballers
Expatriate footballers in Belgium